Thesbia michaelseni is a species of sea snail, a marine gastropod mollusk in the family Raphitomidae.

Description

Distribution

References

 Forcelli, D.O., 2000. Moluscos Magallanicos. Guia de Moluscos [marinos] de Patagonia y Sur de Chile.

External links
 Strebel H. (1905). Beiträge zur Kenntnis der Molluskenfauna der Magelhaen-Provinz. No. 3. Zoologische Jahrbücher, Abteilung für Systematik, Geographie und Biologie der Tiere. 22: 575-666, pls 21-24
 Luca, J. D.; Zelaya, D. G. (2019). Gastropods from the Burdwood Bank (southwestern Atlantic): an overview of species diversity. Zootaxa. 4544(1): 41-78
 Biolib.cz: Thesbia michaelsini

michaelseni
Gastropods described in 1905